Brad Sutterfield (born February 23, 1969) is an American professional golfer who played on the PGA Tour, European Tour, Challenge Tour, Nationwide Tour, Asian Tour and the Canadian Tour. He is the current head coach of the men's golf team at Utah Tech University.

Sutterfield joined the PGA Tour in 1997, earning his Tour card through qualifying school but wasn't able to retain his card. His only other full season on the PGA or Nationwide Tour came in 2007 when he played on the Nationwide Tour. He joined the Challenge Tour in 2005 where he won two events, the TIM Peru Open and the Open de Toulouse. He split time between the European Tour and the Challenge Tour in 2006. He also played on the Canadian Tour from 1999 to 2006 and won the Barton Creek Classic in 2004. He has also played on the Asian Tour. He played college golf with Mike Weir at Brigham Young University.

Professional wins (3)

Challenge Tour wins (2)

1Co-sanctioned by the Tour de las Américas

Canadian Tour wins (1)
2004 Barton Creek Classic

See also
1996 PGA Tour Qualifying School graduates

References

External links

American male golfers
BYU Cougars men's golfers
PGA Tour golfers
European Tour golfers
Asian Tour golfers
College golf coaches in the United States
Golfers from Washington (state)
Sportspeople from Bellevue, Washington
1969 births
Living people